Moisés Ignacio Mier Velazco (born 4 January 1961) is a Mexican politician who leads the National Regeneration Movement in the Chamber of Deputies.

References 

Living people
1961 births
Morena (political party) politicians
21st-century Mexican politicians

Deputies of the LXIV Legislature of Mexico
Deputies of the LVII Legislature of Mexico
Deputies of the LXV Legislature of Mexico
Members of the Chamber of Deputies (Mexico) for Puebla